Odd Man In is the 31st album by Jerry Lee Lewis.  It was released in 1975 on the Mercury label. The album title was credited to Joanie Lawrence.

Recording
By the mid-seventies, Lewis was as big a country music legend as he was a rock and roll icon, and songwriters provided him with compositions that played up to the myth of "the Killer."  "A change came over many of Lewis's later Mercury recordings," observes Colin Escott in the liner notes to the 2006 box set A Half Century of Hits.  "He found songwriters who understood his feelings, and he in turn etched himself indelibly on their words. Mack Vickery's 'That Kind of Fool' elicited one of Lewis’s most brutal performances.  The regret was almost palpable. In June 1975, Lewis arrived at Mercury’s Nashville studio with his voice almost shot. Kris Kristofferson's keyboard player, Donnie Fritts, had written a song especially for him, "A Damn Good Country Song". Lewis turned in an artlessly affecting performance. As always, the remorse was tempered with arrogance."

Odd Man In made it to number 33 on the Billboard country albums chart, the worst showing for any of his Mercury country albums since 1965's Country Songs for City Folks.  Two singles, "A Damn Good Country Song", and "Don't Boogie Woogie", did not crack the Top 20. In 2006, Lewis would cut "That Kind of Fool" as a duet with Keith Richards for his Last Man Standing album.

Track listing
"Don't Boogie Woogie (When You Say Your Prayers Tonight)" (Layng Martine Jr.)
"Shake, Rattle & Roll" (Charles E. Calhoun)
"You Ought to See My Mind" (Carl Knight)
"I Don't Want to Be Lonely Tonight" (Baker Knight)
"That Kind of Fool" (Mack Vickery)
"Goodnight Irene" (Huddie Ledbetter, Alan A. Lomax)
"A Damn Good Country Song" (Donnie Fritts)
"Jerry's Place" (Ray Griff)
"When I Take My Vacation to Heaven" (Herbert Buffum)
"Crawdad Song" (Traditional; arranged by Jerry Lee Lewis)
"Your Cheatin' Heart" (Hank Williams)

Personnel
Jerry Lee Lewis - vocals, piano
Billy Sanford, Chip Young, Don McMinn, Harold Bradley, Jerry Shook, Johnny Christopher, Pete Wade, Ray Edenton, Tommy Allsup - guitar
Lloyd Green, Pete Drake - steel guitar
Kenny Lovelace - fiddle
Bob Moore, Mike Leech - bass
Hargus "Pig" Robbins - piano, organ
Buddy Harman - drums
Millie Kirkham, Priscilla Hubbard, Trish Williams - vocal accompaniment 
The Jordanaires (Gordon Stoker, Hoyt Hawkins, Neal Matthews, Ray Walker) - vocal accompaniment 
Technical
Larry Rogers, Tom Sparkman - engineer
Knox Phillips - vocal overdub supervision
David Deahl - cover photography

External links

1975 albums
Jerry Lee Lewis albums
Albums produced by Jerry Kennedy
Mercury Records albums